Alexander August Wilhelm von Pape (2 February 1813 – 7 May 1895) was a Royal Prussian infantry Colonel-General with the special rank of Generalfeldmarschall.

Biography 
Pape was born in Berlin. He started his military career in 1830 as Fahnenjunker of the 2nd Guards Infantry Regiment. In 1856, as a Major, he was appointed to head the cadet school in Potsdam, and in 1860 he became a battalion commander.

In the Austro-Prussian War of 1866, Pape was a Colonel commanding the 2nd Guards Infantry Regiment, which he had led since 1863, and then the 2nd Guards Infantry Brigade. On 17 September 1866, Pape was awarded the Pour le Mérite for his services during the war. On 31 December 1866 he was promoted to Generalmajor. On the outbreak of the Franco-Prussian War of 1870/71, he was given command of the 1st Guards Infantry Division which took St.-Privat-la-Montagne on 18 August, then successfully fought in the Battle of Sedan, leading to the Siege of Paris and the final victory.

In 1880 Pape was promoted to General of the Infantry and given command of the V Corps. In 1881 he led the III Corps and in 1884 he was appointed to the lead of the Guards Corps. In September 1888, Pape was relieved of this position and promoted to the rank of Colonel General with the rank of Field Marshal. He held the position of Governor of Berlin and was in charge of the military within the Province of Brandenburg. By 1885 he was a member of the Landesverteidigungskommission.

Pape retired in January 1895. He died shortly thereafter on 7 May in his hometown of Berlin. Pape was highly respected to that by Emperor William, who called him "The role model of a traditional Prussian military leader".

The street "General-Pape-Straße" in Tempelhof was named in honor of Pape by a decree of the emperor. A train station of the Berlin S-Bahn was named "Station Papestraße" until 27 May 2006, when it was renamed Berlin Südkreuz to match with similar names like Ostkreuz and Westkreuz.

Honours
He received the following orders and decorations:

Literature
 Kurt von Priesdorff: Soldatisches Führertum. Band 8, Hanseatische Verlagsanstalt Hamburg, ohne Jahr, pp. 258–266.
 Bernhard von Poten: Pape, Alexander von. In: Allgemeine Deutsche Biographie (ADB). Band 52, Duncker & Humblot, Leipzig 1906, p. 749 f.

References

External links 
http://www.pourlemerite.org

1813 births
1895 deaths
German military personnel of the Franco-Prussian War
Prussian people of the Austro-Prussian War
Military personnel from Berlin
People from the Province of Brandenburg
Colonel generals of Prussia
19th-century Prussian military personnel
Recipients of the Pour le Mérite (military class)
Recipients of the Iron Cross (1870), 1st class
Grand Crosses of the Military Merit Order (Bavaria)
Knights Grand Cross of the Order of Saints Maurice and Lazarus
Grand Cordons of the Order of the Rising Sun
Knights Commander of the Military Order of William
Recipients of the Military Merit Cross (Mecklenburg-Schwerin), 1st class
Grand Crosses of the Order of Aviz
Grand Crosses of the Order of the Star of Romania
Recipients of the Order of the White Eagle (Russia)
Recipients of the Order of St. George of the Fourth Degree
Recipients of the Order of St. Vladimir, 2nd class
Commanders Grand Cross of the Order of the Sword